Bargarh is a Vidhan Sabha constituency of Bargarh district.
Area of this constituency includes Bargarh, Bargarh block and part of Barpali block.

Elected Members

16 elections held during 1951 to 2019. List of members elected from this constituency are:

 2019: Debesh Acharya JI(BJD)
 2014: Debesh Acharya (BJD)
 2009: Sadhu Nepak (Congress)
 2004: Ananda Acharya (BJD)
 2000: Ananda Acharya (BJD)
 1995: Prasanna Acharya (Janata Dal)
 1990: Prasanna Acharya (Janata Dal)
 1985: Jadumani Pradhan (Congress)
 1980: Jadumani Pradhan (Congress)-1
 1977: Nabin Kumar Pradhan (Janata Dal)
 1974: Nabin Kumar Pradhan (Utkal Congress)
 1971: Chittaranjan Kar (Jana Congress)
 1967: Bharat Chandra Hota (Congress)
 1961: Gananath Pradhan (Independent)
 1957: Nikunja Bihari Singh (Ganatantra Parishad), and Mahananda Bahadur (Ganatantra Parishad)
 1951: Tirthabasi Pradhan (Congress)

2019 Election Result
In 2019 election, Biju Janata Dal candidate Debesh Acharya defeated Bharatiya Janata Party candidate Ashwini Kumar Sarangi by a margin of 8,452 votes.

2014 Election Result
In 2014 election, Biju Janata Dal candidate Debesh Acharya defeated Indian National Congress candidate Sadhu Nepak by a margin of 13,204 votes.

2009 Election Result 
In 2009 election Indian National Congress candidate Sadhu Nepak, defeated Biju Janata Dal candidate Ananda Acharya by 1,969 votes.

Notes

References

Bargarh district
Assembly constituencies of Odisha